Alex Varnyú (born 1 August 1995) is a Hungarian short track speed skater. He participated at the 2019 World Short Track Speed Skating Championships, winning a medal.

References

External links

1995 births
Living people
Hungarian male short track speed skaters
Speed skaters from Budapest
World Short Track Speed Skating Championships medalists